Yevgeny Yevgeniyevich Korotyshkin, occasionally spelled "Evgeny", (born 30 April 1983) is a Russian swimmer from Moscow.  He specialises in the butterfly stroke, winning the silver medal in the 100 m butterfly at the 2012 Summer Olympics.

References

External links
 

1983 births
Living people
Russian male swimmers
Male butterfly swimmers
World record holders in swimming
Swimmers at the 2004 Summer Olympics
Swimmers at the 2008 Summer Olympics
Swimmers at the 2012 Summer Olympics
Olympic swimmers of Russia
World Aquatics Championships medalists in swimming
Olympic silver medalists for Russia
Medalists at the FINA World Swimming Championships (25 m)
European Aquatics Championships medalists in swimming
Medalists at the 2012 Summer Olympics
Olympic silver medalists in swimming
Universiade medalists in swimming
Universiade gold medalists for Russia